Jessica Candice "Jessi" Miley-Dyer (born 29 May 1986) is a professional surfer from New South Wales, Australia. She currently resides in Sydney.

Profesional surfer

Miley-Dyer began surfing at the age of eight and became a professional surfer in 2006, having a very strong performance finishing #4 in the 2006 ASP Women's World Tour. She finished her rookie season by winning the Billabong Pro Maui, beating World Champion Layne Beachley in December 2006. Miley-Dyer also became the inaugural Billabong World Junior Women's Champion and was named the Rookie of the Year of the Association of Surfing Professionals for 2006.

In 1999 Miley-Dyer won a National Scholastic Snow Boarding Title. In 2000, she was selected by Surf Lifesaving Australia to be an Olympic Torch bearer. She carried the Olympic Torch on a surf boat into Bondi Beach. The same year she competed in the Tip Top Australian Age Swimming Championships. In 2005 Miley-Dyer won the Australasian Pro Junior Surfing Titles. In 2000 and 2001 she won the Australian National Under 16 Surfing Titles. In 2003, she won the Australian National Under 18 Surfing Titles as well as the World ISA Under 18 Title, all whilst studying for her Higher School Certificate final exams. She returned to school and completed the HSC the next month. In 2006, she won the WQS Series.

Miley-Dyer is the women's representative on the ASP Board. Ripcurl is her major sponsor and have been supporting her since she was 14 years of age.

On March 1, 2021 Miley-Dyer became World Surfing League Head of Competition.

Education
Miley-Dyer attended Sydney Girls High School. She received a UAI of 98 and the Ben Lexcen Sports Scholarship to study at the University of New South Wales.

References

External links

 Official site http://www.lovejessi.com/
 Rip Curl Profile
 Photo from 2007 US Open of Surfing

1986 births
World Surf League surfers
Living people
Australian female surfers
Sportspeople from Sydney
People educated at Sydney Girls High School